The 2007 Allstate 400 at The Brickyard, the 14th running of the event, was the twentieth race of the 2007 NASCAR Nextel Cup Series season and the first of the season that was televised by NASCAR on ESPN. It was held on July 29, 2007 at the Indianapolis Motor Speedway in Speedway, Indiana.

Pre-race 

Two Nextel Cup Series teams announced changes in their ownership just before this race:
 Dale Earnhardt Inc. merged with Ginn Racing, taking over the No. 01 team of Mark Martin and Aric Almirola, and closing the Nos. 13 and 14 teams after Ginn had released Joe Nemechek and Sterling Marlin because of sponsorship difficulties. The No. 14 and No. 15 teams switched positions in the standings, guaranteeing Paul Menard, the driver of the No. 15, a starting spot. Regan Smith, who had shared driving duties with Martin, was reassigned to the Craftsman Truck Series.
 Terry Labonte filled in for Michael Waltrip in the No. 55 Toyota which originally made Bill Elliott, winner of the 2002 race, and his No. 21 Wood Brothers/JTG Racing team ineligible for the past champion's provisional since Labonte's championship is more recent than Elliott's. However, with the closing of the Nos. 13 and 14 teams from Ginn, Elliott was assured of racing in this event.
 Originally, there were 51 cars on the initial entry list, including the No. 13 team, which was left without a driver and sponsor. The No. 14 team was entered with Smith as the driver, but because of the merger between DEI and Ginn Racing, the final entry list only included 49 cars.

Qualifying 

OP: qualified via owners points

PC: qualified as past champion

PR: provisional

QR: via qualifying race

* - had to qualify on time

Failed to qualify, withdrew, or driver changes:   Joe Nemechek (#08), A.J. Allmendinger (#84), Kevin Lepage (#37), Dale Jarrett (#44), Jeremy Mayfield (#36), Kenny Wallace (#78), Regan Smith (#14-WD), ? (#13-WD)

Race

Results

Notes 
 For the first time in history, there was not a testing session before this race.
 This race marked the second time an Indy NASCAR race was on cable television. Either ABC or NBC televised all 13 of the previous events except for 1995, when ESPN showed the race on one day's tape delay. This time, the 400 was originally scheduled to air on ESPN, while ABC would not takeover the broadcast until September. Additionally, this was the first NASCAR Cup race aired on ESPN since the 2000 season finale of what was then the Winston Cup Series.
 Dale Jarrett's failure to qualify meant that only 4 drivers had started every Brickyard 400 since its inception in 1994: Jeff Gordon, Bobby Labonte, Mark Martin, and Bill Elliott.
 Kevin Harvick, who led part of the race until Stewart overtook him on lap 149, missed the victory by a close finish to become the 3rd driver to win the Daytona 500 and the Brickyard 400 in the same year.

Post-race 
For the second time since 2004, a winning driver uttered an obscenity in a live post-race interview when Stewart said "This one's for every one of those fans in the stands who pull for me every week and take all the bullshit from everybody else" to then ESPN pit reporter Dave Burns. At first, it was perceived to be in response to critics who have gone after his blunt and abrasive personality, but it has since been reported that Stewart was the subject of statements made by Pardon the Interruption co-hosts Tony Kornheiser and Michael Wilbon on the show that aired the day after Stewart's win at the USG Sheetrock 400. After Stewart joked about celebrating the victory by drinking a case of Schlitz beer, the co-hosts concluded that the driver was a bad role model for children. Whether the comments were a form of revenge against the network is open for interpretation.

On the Tuesday after the race, Stewart was fined  by NASCAR, and lost 25 points in the driver's championship due to the infraction. His team, Joe Gibbs Racing, also was penalized 25 points in the owners' championship. However, his classification of fifth in the championship standings remained the same despite the penalty. Dale Earnhardt Jr., who said the word "shit" after winning the 2004 EA Sports 500 at Talladega Superspeedway had been given the same penalty that year.

References

External links 
 Complete results
 Points standings

Allstate 400
Allstate 400
NASCAR races at Indianapolis Motor Speedway
July 2007 sports events in the United States